Belen is a village in the District of Kıbrıscık, Bolu Province, Turkey. Its population is 126 (2021).

References

Villages in Kıbrıscık District